Victoria Thornley (born 30 November 1987) is a Welsh rower. She won a silver medal for Great Britain with Katherine Grainger in the women's double sculls at the 2016 Summer Olympics. She was also a member of the Great Britain team that finished fifth in the women's eight at the 2012 Summer Olympics, and finished fourth in the single sculls at the 2020 Summer Olympics.

Early life and education
Thornley was born in St Asaph to Andrew and Gina Thornley, and was brought up in Wrexham. She has two sisters. After completing her secondary education at Bishop Heber High School, she went on to study Business Management at the University of Bath and graduate from the GB Rowing Team Start programme. 

Before rowing, Thornley was a national championship winning show jumper, having participated since the age of twelve. She also briefly worked as a fashion model.

Rowing career
Thornley began her sporting career through the "Sporting Giants" programme, becoming the first of the scheme's graduates to win a gold medal when she was successful at the 2009 World Under-23 Championships.

She was part of the British squad that topped the medal table at the 2011 World Rowing Championships in Bled, where she won a bronze medal as part of the eight with Alison Knowles, Jo Cook, Jessica Eddie, Louisa Reeve, Natasha Page, Lindsey Maguire, Katie Greves and Caroline O'Connor.

In the 2016 Summer Olympics, she was partnered with Katherine Grainger in the women's double sculls, in which they took the silver medal.

In June 2017 Thornley won the gold medal for women's single sculls in the European Rowing Championship at Račice. She won a silver medal at the 2017 World Rowing Championships in Sarasota, Florida in the single sculls.

In 2021, she won a European silver medal in the single sculls in Varese, Italy. She then finished 4th in the single sculls final at the Tokyo 2020 Olympics. .

Thornley announced her retirement from rowing in November 2021.

Personal life
In 2020, Thornley married retired Olympic rower Ric Edgington.

References

External links
 
 Victoria Thornley at British Rowing
 
 

1987 births
Living people
Sportspeople from St Asaph
Welsh female rowers
Members of Leander Club
Rowers at the 2012 Summer Olympics
Rowers at the 2016 Summer Olympics
Rowers at the 2020 Summer Olympics
Olympic rowers of Great Britain
Medalists at the 2016 Summer Olympics
Olympic silver medallists for Great Britain
Olympic medalists in rowing
World Rowing Championships medalists for Great Britain
European Rowing Championships medalists